Nurken is a Kazakh masculine given name. Notable people with the name include:

Nurken Abdirov (1919–1942), Kazakh pilot
Nurken Mazbayev (born 1972), Kazakhstani football forward

Kazakh masculine given names